The 2005–06 Swiss Super League season was the 109th season of top-tier football in Switzerland. The competition is officially named AXPO Super League due to sponsoring purposes. It began on 13 July 2005 and has ended on 14 May 2006.

Teams

The 2005-06 Super League was contested by 10 teams. These being the first eight from the previous season, the winner of the previous season relegation play-off and one promoted team.

Basel were the defending champions, Thun were the previous runners-up. The next six teams were Grasshoppers (previous third) and FC Zürich (fifth) both of whom played in the UEFA Cup, Young Boys (fourth) and Neuchâtel Xamax (sixth) both of whom played in the UEFA Intertoto Cup and St. Gallen (seventh) and Aarau (eighth.

Because the parent company of Servette FC was declared bankrupt during the previous February and because the consequence was that the team had their license revoked, they did not finish the previous season and were relegated. The Challenge League 2004–05 champions Yverdon-Sport FC replaced them. FC Schaffhausen retained their position in the Super League by beating Challenge League runners-up FC Vaduz 2–1 in a two-legged relegation play-off.

Overview

Season
The first round of the season was played on 19 July 2005. During the first half of the season the tens teams played a double round robin (home and away round) which was played through till 11 December. Then there was a winter break until the second half began on 12 February 2006. Again the tens teams played a double round robin. The last round of the season was played on 13 May 2006. The highest attendance at a match was 32,712 on the final day of the season in the game Basel against Zürich on 13 May 2006.

The league championship was decided by goal difference, with FC Zürich being named champions. Thus Zürich qualified for the 2006–07 Champions League, Basel and Young Boys qualified for the 2006–07 UEFA Cup and the Grasshoppers qualified for the 2006 UEFA Intertoto Cup. Yverdon-Sport were relegated and Xamax played in the Relegation play-off.

Basel hooligan incident
On the final day of the season, Basel were in first position in the league table, three points clear, and they had a home fixture in the sold out St. Jakob-Park against their sole remaining rivals for the championship title Zürich. A last-minute goal from Iulian Filipescu gave Zürich their first national championship since the 1980–81 season. The last minute loss of the Championship resulted in subsequent riots, the so-called Basel hooligan incident. Basel were punished because of their inability to control its own fans.

League table

Results 
Teams play each other four times in this league. In the first half of the season each team played every other team twice (home and away) and then do the same in the second half of the season.

First half of season

Second half of season

Relegation play-offs

Sion won 3–0 on aggregate.

Top goalscorers

Sources and references
 an English link to footballviolence.wordpress.com

Swiss Super League seasons
Swiss
1